Vestal Central School, also known as Central Junior High School, is a historic school building located at Vestal in Broome County, New York.  It was built in 1939 and is a large three to four story, modified "U" shaped structure.  It is built of variegated brick over cinder block  with a steel frame and a reinforced concrete foundation.  The interior features a number of Art Deco style details.  Also on the property is the original bus garage built in 1950.  The school is now occupied by the Vestal Senior Center, Evergreen Alternative High School, several small businesses, and administrative offices of the Vestal Central School District.

It was listed on the National Register of Historic Places in 2010.

References

School buildings completed in 1939
School buildings on the National Register of Historic Places in New York (state)
Art Deco architecture in New York (state)
Buildings and structures in Broome County, New York
National Register of Historic Places in Broome County, New York